The Virgin and Child with the Infant Saint John the Baptist is a tempera painting on wood executed by the Italian Renaissance master Sandro Botticelli and his studio (Bartolomeo di Giovanni or Raffaelino di'Carli). The tondo, painted in Florence between the years of 1490 and 1500, addresses a central theme of the Italian Renaissance art: the divine motherhood. The work is now in the São Paulo Museum of Art.

Background and iconography 
The iconography of the Madonna with the infant Jesus is one of the most recurrent themes throughout art history. Its origin goes back to the hieratic representations of the High Middle Ages where Mary, crowned, enthroned or standing, presents the divine infant in her arms. The painters of the Italian Renaissance contributed to the widespread representation of the "Virgin of Tenderness", characterized by a more emotional and humane representation of this theme, rather than the strictly sacred approach given by the Byzantine art. In the words of Marcio Doctors, the Renaissance Madonnas mark "the Renaissance spirit which it characterizes: faith in mankind, as subjectivity, placing it in the center of the world. Both the Renaissance and the maternal love embrace the man in the same way when they make the world revolve around him".

Botticelli produced a large number of Madonnas during the decades of 1480 and 1490. A considerable part consisted of tondi, in which the artist portrayed Mary, the Divine Child and the Infant Saint John the Baptist in worship. The tondi (tondo, singular) were works of art in circular shape (paintings or sculptures), mostly of sacred or historical themes. They were much appreciated in the 15th century and often ordered by patrons and guilds to decorate palaces or for use as objects of private devotion.

Painting 
The MASP painting is unanimously dated in the last decade of the 15th century, based on similarities with other works from this period, in which one perceives a change in pictorial style of the author. We emphasize the beautiful structure of the composition, in which the figures of the Virgin and Child stand boldly inside the tondo, hereby freeing himself from the elegant symmetry of his youth.
The same compositional clearance can be noted in the details of the angled seat, upon which rests the book Magnificat, supported on the frame of the painting in an almost illusionist fashion. It is equally noteworthy the remarkable intensification of the emotional bond that unites Mary and baby Jesus, unusual in Madonnas executed by the painter in his youth.

The Italian art historian Roberto Longhi notes that the drawing of the scene is structured through "cross and radial lines" and not by "arching flexible lines", which places the work in the aforementioned context of freer composition that marks the maturing style of the painter in the late 15th century. Antonino Santangelo emits a similar opinion, noting that the "free and harmonious intertwining of hands and faces, mobility and precision  recall the works of Botticelli shortly before 1500".

In fact, it is possible to list at least a dozen productions by Botticelli, all of the last decade of the century, similar in composition to the work of MASP, the closest being the tondo that is conserved at the Sterling and Francine Clark Art Institute in Williamstown, Massachusetts, identical to the title of this work and also dated around 1490.

Attribution 
The authorship of the work in question merited a detailed analysis of Roberto Longhi in 1947. In a letter to Pietro Maria Bardi, now in the MASP archives, the Italian historian claims that it is possible to observe in the tondo "undoubtedly the hand of Botticelli." His opinion was corroborated by Antonino Santangelo, who said, "one can recognize the direct intervention on the painting by Botticelli". The attribution to Botticelli's work was later confirmed by other experts, including Miklos Boskovits and Yukio Yashiro. 

Nevertheless, most critics seem to agree that a part of the landscape in the background and the figure of St. John the Baptist would have been performed by an auxiliary in the studio of Botticelli, based on clear difference in style compared to the figure of the Virgin and Child. Roberto Longhi believes that the drawings of the landscape and the Infant Saint John the Baptist are more typical of Ghirlandaio and proposes the name of Bartolomeo di Giovanni – disciple of both painters – as a possible contributor to the implementation of the Botticelli tondo.  Antonino Santangelo, in turn, credits the implementation of the auxiliary figure of Saint John the Baptist to Raffaelino de 'Carli.

Provenance 
Originally, the work decorated the Palace Capponi of Florence, designed by Lorenzo di Bicci in 1410 by order of Niccolò da Uzzano. In the 19th century, the tondo became part of the private collection of the wealthy English merchant Thomas Blayds in Liverpool. Later, the work was sold to Lord Wigan, Earl of Crawford and Balcarres, thus remaining in England. On October 2 of 1947, the work was acquired by the São Paulo Museum of Art with funds donated by Mrs. Sinha Junqueira, businesswoman and patron from Ribeirão Preto.

References

Bibliography 

 Bardi, Pietro Maria. Museu de Arte de São Paulo: Catálogo das pinturas, esculturas e tapeçarias, São Paulo, MASP, 1982.
 Bardi, Pietro Maria. Sodalício com Assis Chateaubriand, São Paulo, MASP, 1963.
 Carlo, Bo, Mandel, Gabriele. L'opera completa di Botticelli, Milan, Rizzoli, 1967.
 Costa, Paulo de Freitas, Doctors, Márcio. Universos Sensíveis: As coleções de Eva e Ema Klabin, São Paulo,GraphBox Caran, 2004.
 
 Marques, Luiz. "Boletim do Instituto de História da Arte do MASP: Arte italiana em coleções brasileiras, 1250–1950", São Paulo, Lemos Editorial & Gráficos, 1996.
 Marques, Luiz. Catálogo do Museu de Arte de São Paulo Assis Chateaubriand: Arte italiana, São Paulo, Prêmio, 1998, p. 53–56.
 Marques, Luiz. Corpus da Arte Italiana em Coleções Brasileiras, 1250–1950: A arte italiana no Museu de Arte de São Paulo, São Paulo, Berlendis e Vertecchia, 1996, p. 49–52.
 Yashiro, Yukio. Sandro Botticelli, London, The Medici Society, 1925.

1490s paintings
Paintings in the collection of the São Paulo Museum of Art
Paintings of the Madonna and Child by Sandro Botticelli
Paintings depicting John the Baptist
Paintings of the Madonna and Child